The 1930–31 Egypt Cup was the tenth edition of the Egypt Cup.

The final was held on 26 June 1931. The match was contested by Al Ahly and Zamalek, with Al Ahly winning 4–1. In that game, Mokhtar El Tetsh was the first player to score a hat trick in the Cairo Derby.

Quarter-finals

Semi-finals

Final

References 

 

3
Egypt Cup
1930–31 in Egyptian football